The World's Desire is a 1915 British silent drama film directed by Sidney Morgan and starring Lilian Braithwaite, Fred Groves and A.V. Bramble.

Cast
 Lilian Braithwaite as Claire Bennett  
 Fred Groves as Sir Richard Bennett  
 A.V. Bramble as George Cleaver  
 Joan Morgan as Betty  
 M. Gray Murray as Dr. Frank Saxon  
 Kathleen Warwick as Mrs. Cleaver

References

Bibliography
 Palmer, Scott. British Film Actors' Credits, 1895-1987. McFarland, 1988.

External links

1915 films
1915 drama films
British silent feature films
British drama films
Films directed by Sidney Morgan
Films set in England
British black-and-white films
1910s English-language films
1910s British films
Silent drama films